Etobicoke Hall of Fame is a civic hall of fame in Toronto, Ontario, Canada. It began as a project of Etobicoke, a borough of Metropolitan Toronto. Etobicoke is now part of the larger city of Toronto. The project has been continued by the City of Toronto government.

Inductees

Dr. A. Ann Curtin (1889-1977), 1974
Thomas Fisher (1792-1874), 1974
William Gamble (1805-1881), 1974
Robert A. Given (b. 1924), 1974
W. Earle Gordon (1891-1968), 1974
Morfudd Harries (1903-1996), 1974
Flt. Lt. David E. Hornell, VC (1910-1944), 1974
Gus Ryder (1899-1991), 1974
Robert Home Smith (1877-1935), 1974
Reverend Canon Francis Treymayne, (1829-1919), 1974
Gordon Sinclair (1900-1984), 1984
Murray and Margaret Dryden (1911-2004, 1907-1985), 1986
F. Edna Gardner (1904-1991), 1986
Dr. J. Page Harshman (1916-1977), 1986
Cliff Lumsdon (1931-1991), 1986
Barry Gosse (1937-1988), 1987
Geoffrey H. Wood (1896-1995), 1987
Frederick T. James (1869-1949), 1988
John Borden Hamilton, Q.C. (1913-2005), 1988
Donald Strathdee (1931-1989), 1988
Dr. Lap-Chee Tsui, 1989
Alice Rycroft (1914-2015), 1990
Sonny Thomson (1932-1993), 1990
June Callwood (1924-2007), 1992
John P. MacBeth (1921-1991), 1993
James A. McNabb (1905-1995), 1996
Vera Halhed (1914-1996), 1997
Elizabeth "Betty" Coulter
Marie Curtis (1912-2006)
Stewart Davidson Sr. (1924-1985)
Reverend Stewart B. East
Howard P. Lowe (1914-1991)
Nora Pownall (1925-2015)
Kemp Scott (1914-2015), 1989

External links
 Etobicoke Hall of Fame at the City of Toronto website

Etobicoke
Halls of fame in Canada